Willy Kipkorir Bett Born on April 14, 1963 is a Kenyan politician and the current Kenyan Ambassador to India. He is the former Cabinet Secretary in the Ministry of Agriculture, Livestock, and Fisheries. He held the post from December 2015 to January 26, 2018. Prior to this, he was the managing director of the Kenya Seed Company. He vastly improved the company's standing, taking revenue from 2.9 billion KES to 5.0 billion KES, and profit from 50 million KES to 434 million KES. Before that, he was a marketing manager at the Kenyan Postbank for 18 years. He holds an MBA from the University of Nairobi.

Corruption Allegations
Mr. Bett is currently the Kenyan Ambassador to India, following a cabinet reshuffle that saw William Ruto's right-hand man from Postbank, Kenya seed and Agriculture ministry moved due to abuse of office.

References

Living people
University of Nairobi alumni
Kenyan businesspeople
Kenyan politicians
Year of birth missing (living people)